Gornorechensky (lit. mountain river) is an urban locality (an urban-type settlement) in Kavalerovsky District of Primorsky Krai, Russia, located  east of Kavalerovo, with which it is connected by an auto route. Population:

History
Founded as the settlement of Kentsukhe in 1945, it was renamed Gornorechensky on December 29, 1972. Urban-type settlement status was granted to it in 1979.

References

 Urban-type settlements in Primorsky Krai